Elisapie Isaac (also known simply as Elisapie;) is a Canadian Inuk musician, broadcaster, documentary filmmaker, and activist. She spent her childhood in Salluit, Nunavik, Quebec, and moved to Montreal in 1999 to pursue communication studies in order to become a journalist.

Biography
Born in Salluit, Quebec to an Inuk mother and a father from Newfoundland, she performed at age twelve with the Salluit band Sugluk. Isaac collaborated with instrumentalist Alain Auger in the musical project Taima (Inuktitut for "that's all" or "it is done") in the early 2000s. The band's sole album, Taima, won the Juno Award for Aboriginal Recording of the Year in 2005. In 2006, Isaac wrote lyrics for songs composed by Bruno Coulais for the film The White Planet.

In 2010, Isaac's first solo album, There Will Be Stars, was released by Pheromone Recordings. On the album, she sings in English, French, and Inuktitut. Her second solo album, Travelling Love, was released in October 2012 under the name Elisapie. During the Juno Awards, she was mistakenly nominated as Breakthrough Artist of the Year, before it was revealed that she had been a Juno winner in 2005; the nomination was rescinded and given to Shawn Hook instead. She garnered a Canadian Screen Award nomination for Best Original Song at the 2nd Canadian Screen Awards for her song "Far Away", which appeared in the film The Legend of Sarila. She was nominated for the Juno Award for Indigenous Music Album of the Year in 2019 for The Ballad of the Runaway Girl. In July 2019, the album was shortlisted for the 2019 Polaris Music Prize. This album again contained lyrics in English, French, and Inuktitut.

Isaac has an extensive background in media production as well. When asked about her work in this medium in relation to her music, she has stated "I really believe that communication and radio was really a place for me to express my inner creativity, and I love that medium. And it has helped me to be a little more aware, especially when I have to be doing interviews and have a larger vision of my work than just the artiste point of view".

In 2021, Isaac was announced to have landed her first acting role, in C.S. Roy's forthcoming augmented reality film, V F C.

If the Weather Permits
Isaac's 2003 National Film Board of Canada documentary If the Weather Permits, filmed in Kangiqsujuaq, northern Quebec, looks at the changing lifestyles of Inuit in Nunavik. The film received several awards, including the Claude Jutra Award for best new director at the Rendez-vous du cinéma québécois, and the Rigoberta Menchu Prize at the First Peoples' Festival. It is included in the 2011 Inuit film anthology Unikkausivut: Sharing Our Stories.

Personal life
Isaac dated actor Patrice Robitaille from 2003 to 2011. In 2006, she gave birth to a daughter, named Lili-Alacie. She also has a son, born in 2014. In February 2018, she revealed that she was pregnant with her third child, a boy.

Awards and nominations

Discography
Taima
 Taima (2004)

Solo
 There Will Be Stars (2010)
 Travelling Love (2012)
 The Ballad of the Runaway Girl (2018)
 Eaux turbulentes (2020) - television soundtrack, with Frédéric Levac

Filmography

References

External links
 
 

1977 births
Living people
Canadian documentary film directors
Canadian Folk Music Award winners
Canadian Inuit women
Canadian women documentary filmmakers
Canadian women film directors
Canadian women pop singers
Félix Award winners
Film directors from Quebec
Inuit filmmakers
Inuit from Quebec
Inuit musicians
Juno Award for Indigenous Music Album of the Year winners
People from Nunavik
Singers from Quebec
21st-century Canadian women singers